This is a list of defunct newspapers in Hungary.

Daily

Weekly

Biweekly
 Magyar Jelen

Telephone news
 Telefon Hírmondó, the longest-running telephone newspaper

See also
 List of newspapers in Hungary
 Media of Hungary

References

Newspapers, defunct
Hungary, defunct
Hungary